Maud is a city in Bowie County, Texas, United States, within the Texarkana metropolitan area. According to the 2020 U.S. census, it had a population of 977.

History
Maud is on the St. Louis Southwestern Railway near U.S. Highway 67 in southern Bowie County. The territory around Maud, known before the Republic of Texas era as the Red River Country, was among the earliest settled areas, but Spanish claims to the land, outlaws from the Neutral Ground, and general lawlessness discouraged extensive development. Before the city of Maud was established, the historic Trammel Trace road went just south of where the city where the crossing of the Sulphur River was made by way of Epperson's Ferry.

After the railroad reached the site in 1870, a community gradually began to emerge. The town was named for Maud Knapp, daughter of Samuel D. Knapp, the first postmaster and the donor of land for the townsite. A post office opened in 1881, closed the next year, then reopened in 1893. By 1910, the population of the town had reached 300, and by 1940 it had grown to 750. These two facilities provided jobs for many Maud citizens. In 1982, Maud had eleven rated businesses and an estimated population of 1,059. The two military installations remained the largest employers of Maud residents. In 1990, the community population was 1,049.

Geography

Maud is located in southern Bowie County at  (33.332185, –94.343244). U.S. Route 67 passes through the center of town, leading northeast  to Texarkana and southwest  to Mount Pleasant. Texas State Highway 8 leads south from Maud  to Linden and north  to New Boston.

Climate

The climate in this area is characterized by hot, humid summers and generally mild to cool winters.  According to the Köppen Climate Classification system, Maud has a humid subtropical climate, abbreviated "Cfa" on climate maps.

Demographics

As of the 2020 United States census, there were 977 people, 442 households, and 259 families residing in the city.

From the 1950 United States census to 2020, Maud has experienced relative growth and decline; with 713 residents in 1950, its population grew to a historic 1,107 in 1970; in 2020, however, its population declined to a further 977 residents.

Among this stagnating and diverging population, there were 1,056 people at the 2010 U.S. census; in 2010, its racial and ethnic makeup was 90.76% White American, 7.59% Black or African American, 0.58% American Indian or Alaska Native, 0.10% Asian, 0.10% from other races and ethnicities, and 0.88% from two or more races and ethnicities. Hispanic or Latino Americans of any race constituted 1.36% of the population. In 2020, out of its 977 residents, 855 were non-Hispanic white.

The median household income for residents in the city was $46,447, and the mean income was $54,979.

Education
Maud is served by the Maud Independent School District.

References

Cities in Bowie County, Texas
Cities in Texas
Cities in Texarkana metropolitan area